Sub Rosa is a historic mansion in Pocahontas, Mississippi, U.S.. It was built for John and Margaret Greaves from 1852 to 1854, and it was designed in the Greek Revival architectural style. In 1870, in the aftermath of the American Civil War, the Greaves moved to Los Angeles, California and rented Sub Rosa to Jim Bostick. The house has been listed on the National Register of Historic Places since April 28, 1975.

References

Houses on the National Register of Historic Places in Mississippi
Greek Revival architecture in Mississippi
Houses completed in 1854
National Register of Historic Places in Hinds County, Mississippi